Events which occurred in Italy or Italian territory in 1300:

Political and military events
 Battle of Ponza (1300) was a naval battle that occurred on 14 June 1300 near the islands of Ponza and Zannone, in the Gulf of Gaeta (NW of Naples), when a galley fleet commanded by Roger of Lauria defeated an Aragonese-Sicilian galley fleet commanded by Conrad d'Oria.
 Sack of Lucera by a Christian army under the command of Charles II of Naples; the Muslim inhabitants were killed or sold into slavery.

Arts
Duccio paints Stoclet Madonna

Religion
 February 22 – The Jubilee of Pope Boniface VIII is celebrated.

Births
Birth of Taddeo Gaddi,  painter and architect.

Deaths
 August 29 – Guido Cavalcanti, poet (born 1250)
 December 12 – Bartolo da San Gimignano,  Italian beatified Catholic priest, member of Third Order of Saint Francis (born 1228)

References

Italy
Italy
Years of the 13th century in Italy